Mohamed Mukhesur Rahman (born 1 February 1970) is a Bangladeshi swimmer. He competed in the 200 m breaststroke at the 1992 Summer Olympics, Rahman finished in 52nd place in the heats so didn't advance any further.

References

External links
 

1970 births
Living people
Bangladeshi male swimmers
Olympic swimmers of Bangladesh
Swimmers at the 1992 Summer Olympics
Place of birth missing (living people)